Sir Harry Innes, 4th Baronet (c. 1670–1721) was a Scottish politician and baronet. He represented the Parliament of Scotland constituency of Elginshire 1704–1707. He was a member of the Innes baronets.

References

1670 births
1721 deaths
Baronets in the Baronetage of Nova Scotia
Shire Commissioners to the Parliament of Scotland
Politics of Moray